The Huangcai Reservoir, also known as Qingyang Lake is a large reservoir located in the northwestern part of Ningxiang in the province of Hunan, China. It is the largest body of water in Ningxiang and the largest reservoir in Ningxiang. The reservoir is the source of the Wei River. It cost about RMB 5,393,300,000.

History
In 1949, the People's Government of Ningxiang, planned to build a reservoir for irrigation, flood control, electricity generation and fish farming.

In 1952, scientists started to survey the boundaries of a piece of land in Huangcai Town. In 1957, scientists started designing it. In May 1958, the construction work started. On 9 May 1961, the Chairman Liu Shaoqi and his wife Wang Guangmei, General Gan Siqi and his wife Li Zhen, the secretary of agriculture minister Liao Luyan, Xu Teli, the interior minister Xie Juezai, and the provincial party secretary Zhou Xiaozhou took part in labour.

In May 1965, the government mobilized a large amount of human labor to complete the project.

References

Bibliography

External links
 

Geography of Ningxiang
Tourist attractions in Changsha
Reservoirs in Hunan